Nicolas Papini (c. 1751 – 16 December 1834) was an Italian monk and historian.

Life

Having entered the Order of the Conventuals he taught Italian literature at Modena, was secretary of the Provincial of Tuscany, custos of the Sacred Convent of Assisi, 1800(?)-1803, a short time guardian of Dodici Apostoli at Rome, and finally named Minister General of the Conventuals 1803-09. Later on he lived at Assisi and Terni, where he is buried.

Works
His printed works are "L'Etruria Francescana o vero raccolta di notizie storiche interessanti l'Ordine de FF. Minori Conventuali di S. Francesco in Toscana", I, Siena, 1797; "Notizie sicure della monte, sepoltura, canonizzazione e traslazione di S. Francesco d'Assisi e del ritrovamento del di lui corpo", 2nd ed., Foligno, 1824; "Storia del Perdono d'Assisi con documenti e osservazioni", Florence, 1824; "La Storia di S. Francesco di Assisi, opera critica," 2 vols., Foligno, 1827.

References
Robinson, A Short Introduction to Franciscan Literature (New York, 1907), 19, 44
Sbaraleas und Papinis literarischer Nachlass in Historisches Jahrbuch, X (1889), 67-9
 Manuale dei Novizii e Professi Chierici e Laici Minori Conventuali (Rome, 1897), 278, 342
Lanzi, Note e ricordi sulla Chiesa di S. Francesco in Terni in Miscellanea Francescana, IX (1902), 6-7

18th-century Italian historians
Conventual Friars Minor
1751 births
1834 deaths
People from the Province of Arezzo
Ministers General of the Order of Friars Minor Conventual
19th-century Italian historians